During the 1999–2000 English football season, Queens Park Rangers F.C. competed in the Football League First Division.

Season summary
In the 1999–2000 season, QPR were in the top half for most of the campaign but even though their play-off hopes were all but sunk after a poor run of form at the turn of the year by going nine league games without a win, QPR still kept themselves well clear of danger.

Final league table

Results
Queens Park Rangers' score comes first

Legend

Football League First Division

FA Cup

League Cup

Players

First-team squad
Squad at end of season

Left club during season

References

Notes

Queens Park Rangers F.C. seasons
Queens Park Rangers F.C.